Hibbertia porcata is a species of flowering plant in the family Dilleniaceae and is endemic to south-eastern continental Australia. It is a small, low-lying to prostrate shrub with linear leaves and yellow flowers with fifteen to twenty-five stamens arranged around three hairy carpels.

Description 
The leaves are sparsely hairy on the upper surface, the lower surface is glabrous and the edges are rolled under.

Taxonomy 
Hibbertia porcata was first formally described in 2013 by Hellmut R. Toelken in the Journal of the Adelaide Botanic Gardens from specimens collected by Erwin Gauba near Lake George in 1949. The specific epithet (porcata) means "ridged", referring to the tip of the sepal lobes.

Distribution and habitat 
This hibbertia is only known from a few specimens collected in eucalypt woodland on the Central and Southern Tablelands and South West Slopes of New South Wales, and a single record from near Christmas Hills in Victoria.

See also 
 List of Hibbertia species

References 

porcata
Flora of New South Wales
Flora of Victoria (Australia)
Plants described in 2013
Taxa named by Hellmut R. Toelken